Kalamazoo is an unincorporated community in Madison County, Nebraska, United States.

History
Kalamazoo had a post office between 1874 and 1904. The community was likely named after Kalamazoo, Michigan. A large F4 tornado hit the town on May 30, 1954 causing major damage. The tornado ended up killing six and injuring 23.

Geography
The elevation of Kalamazoo is 1,722 feet.

Nearby Cities and Towns

References

Unincorporated communities in Madison County, Nebraska
Unincorporated communities in Nebraska